Bruce Young is a former American football coach.  He served as the  head football coach at the Avila University in Kansas City, Missouri from 2005 to 2009.  He was second person to hold the post and his coaching record at Avila was 12–42.  This ranks him second at Avila in terms of total wins and second at Avila in terms of winning percentage.

Young is a graduate of Northwest Missouri State University.

References

Year of birth missing (living people)
Living people
Avila Eagles football coaches
Baker Wildcats football coaches
High school football coaches in Missouri
Northwest Missouri State University alumni